is a Japanese football player who plays for Tokushima Vortis.

Career statistics

Club

References

External links

1999 births
Living people
Japanese footballers
J1 League players
J2 League players
Nagoya Grampus players
SC Sagamihara players
Tokushima Vortis players
Association football midfielders
Universiade medalists in football
Universiade gold medalists for Japan
Medalists at the 2019 Summer Universiade